Conserje en condominio (in English: "Concierge in an Apartment Building") is a 1974 Mexican comedy film directed by Miguel M. Delgado and starring Cantinflas, Claudia Islas and Raquel Olmedo.

Plot
After reading an ad in a newspaper, Úrsulo (Cantinflas) takes a job as a concierge of a luxurious apartment building inhabited by eccentric people who all turn to him to solve their various problems. But when someone in the building kidnaps an important person, Úrsulo must become an investigator and find the kidnapped and the kidnappers.

Cast
Cantinflas as Úrsulo
Claudia Islas as Jackie
Raquel Olmedo as Clodomira
Chucho Salinas as Lic. Silverio Rojas "Rojitas" (as Jesus Salinas)
Carlos Riquelme as Administrador González
Bertha Moss as Señora Candy
Eugenia Avendaño as Señora Margo
Ricardo Carrión as Danny
Gloria Mayo as Lisa
Eduardo Alcaraz as Lic. Rufino
Gladys Vivas as Ad Director
Diana Torres as Domitila
Mitzuko Miguel as Señorita Erica
Gerardo del Castillo as Melesio Martínez (as Gerardo del Castillo Jr.)
Carlos Cámara as Jorge
Carlos Nieto as Police Chief
Irene Moreno as Nancy
Carlos León as Commander
María Fernanda Ampudia as Blonde spiritualist
Jacobo Zabludovsky as Reporter
Guillermo Bravo Sosa as Spiritualist (uncredited)
Alfonso Carti as Policeman (uncredited)
Jorge Casanova as Neighbour (uncredited)
Lilia Castillo as Candy's Maid (uncredited)
Velia Lupercio as Train Passenger (uncredited)
Rubén Márquez as Spiritualist (uncredited)
Mariana Ponzanelli (uncredited)
Paco Sañudo (uncredited)

Reception
The presence of hippies in the film and Cantinflas's character clashing with them was seen by Professor Jeffrey M. Pilcher in Cantinflas and the Chaos of Mexican Modernity as "part of a struggle to represent Mexico's national identity," with Cantinflas's character representing the "pelado from the 1930s." Pilcher noted, however, that "although Cantinflas triumphed over the hippies on screen, many young people considered him a momiza (square)." Both Carlos Monsiváis in Los ídolos a nado and Joanne Hershfield and David R. Maciel in Mexico's Cinema: A Century of Film and Filmmakers considered it among Cantinflas's most "sad and pathetic" films, alongside El ministro y yo (1976).

References

Bibliography
García Riera, Emilio. Historia documental del cine mexicano: 1972–1973. Universidad de Guadalajara, 1992.
Pilcher, Jeffrey M. Cantinflas and the Chaos of Mexican Modernity. Rowman & Littlefield, 2001.
Monsiváis, Carlos. Los ídolos a nado: Una antología global. Penguin Random House Grupo Editorial España, 2011.
Hershfield, Joanne; Maciel, David R. Mexico's Cinema: A Century of Film and Filmmakers. Rowman & Littlefield, 1999.

External links

1974 comedy films
1974 films
Mexican comedy films
Films directed by Miguel M. Delgado
1970s Mexican films